Live: The Last Summer is an album by the blues-rock group the Siegel–Schwall Band.  Their ninth album, it was recorded live in the summer of 1973 at the Brewery in Lansing, Michigan and at the Quiet Knight in Chicago, Illinois. It was released as a vinyl LP by Wooden Nickel Records in 1974.  It was re-released as a CD by Wounded Bird Records in 1999.  The album is also known as The Last Summer.

Track listing
Side one:
"Rock Me Baby" (B.B. King, Joe Josea) – 5:25
"You Don't Love Me Like That" (Jim Schwall) – 3:45
"I Won't Hold My Breath" (Corky Siegel) – 4:16
"Sun is Shining" (Jimmy Reed) – 6:10
"Let's Boogie" (Ken Goerres) – 0:05
Side two:
"Hey, Billie Jean" (Jim Post, Siegel) – 7:26
"West Coast Blues" (Schwall) – 5:20
"Out-a-Gas?" (Siegel) – 7:20

Personnel

Siegel–Schwall Band
Corky Siegel – piano, harmonica, vocals
Jim Schwall – guitar, vocals
Rollo Radford – bass, vocals
Shelly Plotkin – drums, percussion

Production
Produced by the Siegel-Schwall Band, Barry Mraz, and Bill Traut
Engineer: Barry Mraz
Sound: Ken Goerres
Remote recording: Chuck Buchanan
Mastering: Arnie Acosta
Cover art: John Thompson
Art direction: Acy Lehman
Liner photography: Colin Johnson, Nick Sangiamo

References

Siegel–Schwall Band albums
1974 albums